Clary is the surname of:

 Charles Clary (1873–1931), American silent film actor
 David Clary (born 1953), British theoretical chemist, college president, and scientific advisor
 Debbie A. Clary (born 1959), American politician
 Désirée Clary (1777–1860), Queen of Sweden and Norway
 Don Clary (born 1957), American long-distance runner
 Ed Clary (1916–2005), American football player
 Edward Alvin Clary (1883–1939), US Navy sailor and Medal of Honor recipient 
 Ellis Clary (1916–2000), American baseball player, coach and scout
 François Clary (1725–1794), French merchant, father of Désirée and Julie
 Gary Clary (born 1948), American politician
 Jeromey Clary (born 1983), American football player
 Johnny Lee Clary (1959–2014), Ku Klux Klan leader who became an anti-racism preacher
 Joseph M. Clary (1905–1996), American philatelist
 Julian Clary (born 1959), English comedian and novelist
 Julie Clary (1771–1845), spouse of Joseph Bonaparte, Napoleon I's brother
 Robert Clary (1926–2022), American actor, author, and lecturer
 Robert E. Clary (1805–1890), US Army officer
 Tyler Clary (born 1989), American swimmer

See also
 Reginald Clarry (1882–1945), British politician
 Clarey, similar surname
 McClary, another surname